The Lincolnshire Wolds are a range of low hills in the county of Lincolnshire, England which run roughly parallel with the North Sea coast, from the Humber Estuary in the north-west to the edge of the Lincolnshire Fens in the south-east. They are a designated Area of Outstanding Natural Beauty (AONB), and the highest area of land in eastern England between Yorkshire and Kent.

Geology
The Wolds are formed largely from a series of pure marine limestones formed during the Cretaceous period, known collectively as the Chalk Group. The chalk overlies a series of other sedimentary strata of late Jurassic/early Cretaceous age. The strata dip gently to the east and form a scarp which runs southeast from Barton upon Humber via Caistor before it loses its identity north of Spilsby. To the north of the Humber Gap, the same formations continue as the Yorkshire Wolds. The rock succession in stratigraphic order i.e. youngest/uppermost first, is this:
White Chalk Subgroup
Burnham Chalk formation
Welton Chalk Formation
Grey Chalk Subgroup 
Ferriby Chalk Formation
Hunstanton Chalk Formation

The thin Hunstanton Chalk and the Ferriby Chalk formations form much of the west facing Wolds scarp but it is the overlying Welton Chalk Formation which forms the greater part of the easterly dip-slopes with the Ferriby Chalk extensively exposed within the dry dip-slope valleys. The Burnham Chalk Formation forms an indistinct secondary scarp to the east of the main scarp between Barton and Louth. In the north between South Ferriby and Grasby, the lower part of the scarp is formed from the Kimmeridge Clay Formation. A series of other rock layers intervene from the Caistor area southwards, uppermost of which are the green-brown Carstones:

Lower/early Cretaceous
Carstone Formation (sandstone)
Roach Formation (interbedded mudstone and limestone) (present from Stenigot southwards)
Tealby Formation (mudstone - but including the 'Tealby Limestone Member')
Claxby Ironstone Formation
Upper/late Jurassic
Spilsby Sandstone Formation
Kimmeridge Clay Formation

The numerous dry valleys cut into the dip-slope are typically floored by head, locally derived clay, silt, sand and gravel. The western valleys were created during recent glacial periods through the action of water over frozen ground whilst many in the east represent subglacial drainage. During the last ice age (Devensian), ice encroached upon the Wolds from the northeast and entered the Humber gap from the east but did not cover the Wolds, hence there is no Devensian age glacial till on these hills. However an earlier ice age left extensive spreads of till across the central and southern areas. Sections of the main scarp, notably at Saxby All Saints and between Nettleton and Walesby have been subject to landslip.

Geography
The Wolds comprise a series of low hills incised by characteristic dry open valleys.

The Lincolnshire Wolds can be divided into four distinct areas: 
the main area of chalk hills in the north, 
the north west scarp, 
an area of ridges and valleys in the south west,
the claylands in the south east.

The Red Hill nature reserve near the village of Goulceby is notable for the unusual red colour of its soil and underlying chalk.

Wolds Top is the highest point in the whole of Lincolnshire and is marked by a trig point just north of the village of Normanby le Wold, at approximately 551 feet (168 metres) above sea level.

Other hills include:
Castcliffe Hill -  -  
Gaumer Hill -  - 
Hoe Hill -  - 
Meagram Top -  - 
Miles Cross Hill
Tetford Hill -  - 
Warden Hill -  - 

The Wolds provide views across the flat Fens and salt marshes of Lindsey and Holland: it is possible, from various points on the Wolds, to see all of the larger structures in the north and east of the county: the Belmont mast, Boston Stump, Grimsby Dock Tower, the Humber Bridge, Lincoln Cathedral, St James' Church in Louth (known locally as the 'Cathedral of the Wolds', though it holds only parish church status), the radar station near Normanby, Tattershall Castle and the wind turbines on the coast near Mablethorpe.

Waterways

Area of Outstanding Natural Beauty
The Lincolnshire Wolds were designated an Area of Outstanding Natural Beauty (AONB) in 1973, and are managed as such by the Lincolnshire Wolds Countryside Service.

The Wolds AONB covers 560 square kilometres, while the Countryside Service recognises a wider Lincolnshire Wolds Character/Natural Area which incorporates the AONB and the neighbouring areas of the (geographical) Wolds to the north and south.

The Wolds AONB cuts across the council boundaries of Lincolnshire County Council, East Lindsey District Council, West Lindsey District Council and North East Lincolnshire Council. The boundaries of the AONB are marked by tourist signs incorporating stylized hills and trees, placed on roads leading into the area.

People and places
The Wolds are sparsely populated and have a rural character. They are 'ringed' by several small market towns that lie around their edge: 
Alford
Horncastle, billed on tourist signs as the "gateway to the Wolds", lies just outside the south end of the AONB
Louth
Market Rasen
Caistor
Spilsby

Many of the place-names in the Wolds indicate a strong Viking influence in the area's history. There is also an abundance of mediaeval 'lost villages' – settlements abandoned due to changes in land use, soil exhaustion and disease.

Several notable roads and paths run over the Wolds. Caistor High Street, the path of a Roman road and now the route of the B1225, runs from Caistor to Baumber near Horncastle. The ancient Bluestone Heath Road follows the course of an ancient drove road from west to east across the Wolds, and several "A" roads also run through the AONB.

The Wolds are now promoted as a tourist destination: the area's connection with Tennyson (who was born in Somersby) is being exploited, and farmers are being encouraged to diversify into the tourism industry. The roads of the Wolds are particularly popular with motorcyclists, and the area is home to Cadwell Park, one of the UK's top race circuits.

The area is also popular with walkers: the Viking Way long-distance footpath runs from Barton-upon-Humber in North Lincolnshire across the Lincolnshire Wolds and into Rutland, and there is a youth hostel in the middle of the Wolds at Woody's Top near the village of Tetford.

References

Precursor to the Natural England designation

External links

Lincolnshire Wolds
Cadwell Park

Hills of Lincolnshire
Protected areas of Lincolnshire
Natural regions of England
Areas of Outstanding Natural Beauty in England